Kamalini Ramdas is a Professor of Management Science and Operations and Deloitte Chair in Innovation & Entrepreneurship at London Business School, with expertise in the areas of innovation, entrepreneurship, and operations management. Ramdas' research examines innovative approaches, including service innovation, operational innovation, and business model innovation, to accelerate value creation in various service and manufacturing industries.

Career
Kamalini Ramdas earned her BS in mathematics from St. Stephen's College, Delhi University in 1986, M.S. in operations research from University of Delaware in 1989, and PhD in operations management from the Wharton School of University of Pennsylvania in 1995. Prior to joining London Business School in 2008, Ramdas served as Associate Professor of Business Administration at University of Virginia Darden School of Business. She was also on the faculty of McCombs School of Business of The University of Texas at Austin.

At London Business School, Ramdas is a Professor of Management Science and Operations and Deloitte Chair in Innovation & Entrepreneurship. She also serves as the Subject Area Chair of Management Science & Operations.

Between 2019 and 2020, she served as President of the Manufacturing and Service Operations Management Society (MSOM), one of the largest societies of the Institute for Operations Research and the Management Sciences (INFORMS).

Academic work
Ramdas is known for her work in innovation, entrepreneurship, and operations management. Her work has found applications in a wide range of industries, including healthcare, telecommunication, consumer packaged goods, and assembled products.

In particular, she is a pioneering scholar in innovation in healthcare delivery, known internationally for her work in shared medical appointments. In 2011, she was invited to present her work on innovation in healthcare delivery at the World Economic Forum in Davos.

She serves or has served on the editorial board of major operations management journals, including Management Science, Manufacturing & Service Operations Management, IEEE Transactions on Engineering Management, and Productions and Operations Management.

Publications
According to Google Scholar, Ramdas' 10 most widely cited papers are:

References

Academics of London Business School
Wharton School of the University of Pennsylvania alumni
Living people
Management scientists
British business theorists
British women academics
Year of birth missing (living people)
St. Stephen's College, Delhi alumni